Attention Please is a manga by Chieko Hosokawa about the training of flight attendants.

Attention Please may also refer to:
 Attention Please (Boris album), 2011 dream pop album
 Attention Please (Caroline's Spine album), 1999 alternative rock album
 Attention Please (Ether Bunny album), 2017 experimental jazz album
 Attention Please, a show on NE1FM